Close to Home may refer to:

Film and television 
 Close to Home (film), a 2005 Israeli movie
 Close to Home (2001 film), an American TV movie starring Gabrielle Union
 Close to Home (1975 TV series), a New Zealand soap opera
 Close to Home (1989 TV series), a UK sitcom
 Close to Home (2005 TV series), an American crime drama

Television episodes
 "Close to Home" (All Saints)
 "Close to Home" (The Bill)
 "Close to Home" (Canada's Worst Driver)
 "Close to Home" (Casualty)
 "Close to Home" (The Cosby Show)
 "Close to Home" (Under Cover)
 "Close to Home" (Wildfire)
 "Close to Home" (Wycliffe)

Music
 Close to Home (album), an album by Beverley Craven
 Close to Home (band), an American post-hardcore band
 "Close to Home", a 1999 song by The Get Up Kids from their album Something to Write Home About
 "Close to Home", a 2002 song by Blue Six from their album Beautiful Tomorrow
 "Close to Home", a 2022 album by Aitch

Other media 
 Close to Home (comic strip), a syndicated comic strip by John McPherson
 Close to Home (novel) a 1979 novel by Deborah Moggach
 Close to Home (Robinson novel) a 2003 novel by Peter Robinson
 Close to Home: A Materialist Analysis of Women's Oppression, a 1984 book by Christine Delphy

See also 
 Closer to Home, an album by Grand Funk Railroad
 "I'm Your Captain (Closer to Home)", the title song
 So Close to Home, an album by The Gathering Field
 Too Close to Home, a novel by Linwood Barclay